The Canarian Independent Groups (AIC) were a Spanish political party based in the Canary Islands that existed from 1985 until its integration in Canarian Coalition.

History
The party was founded in 1985 with the name of Federation of Canarian Independent Groups, consisting of the union of different parties and groupings of insular scope, coming mostly from the former Union of the Democratic Centre (UCD). On 23 April 1986 they changed their name to Canarian Independent Groups. In 1987 it was joined by the Canarian Union of the Centre. The members of AIC were mainly centre-right and insularist political groups.

In 1993, together with the Nationalist Canarian Initiative (ICAN), Majorera Assembly (AM), Canarian Nationalist Party (PNC) and Independent Canarian Centre (CCI) it formed Canarian Coalition (CC). However, in 1994, Independents of Fuerteventura (IF) and Lanzarote Independents Group (transformed into the Lanzarote Independents Party (PIL)) abandon both Canarian Independent Groups and Canarian Coalition.

It obtained parliamentary representation in the general elections of 1986 and in the ones of 1989. It was dissolved definitively during the Canarian Coalition Congress celebrated in 18–19 May 2005, in which all the integral parties disappeared and CC became unique party.

Members
The groups that were members of the party are:
 Tenerife Group of Independents (ATI)
 La Palma Group of Independents (API)
 Gomera Group of Independents (AGI)
 Independents of Fuerteventura (IF)
 Lanzarote Independents Group (AIL), although this group ended up leaving the organization..

Election results

Parliament of the Canary Islands

Cortes Generales

European Parliament

References

Political parties in the Canary Islands
Political parties established in 1985
Regionalist parties in Spain
1985 establishments in Spain
Canarian nationalist parties